Oldřich Kučera (1 July 1914 – 1 January 1964) was a Czech ice hockey player. He competed in the men's tournament at the 1936 Winter Olympics.

References

External links
 

1914 births
1964 deaths
Czech ice hockey forwards
Ice hockey players at the 1936 Winter Olympics
Olympic ice hockey players of Czechoslovakia
Ice hockey people from Prague
Czechoslovak expatriate sportspeople in Switzerland
Czechoslovak expatriate ice hockey people
Czechoslovak ice hockey forwards
Czechoslovak ice hockey coaches
Czech ice hockey coaches
Czechoslovak emigrants to Australia